Rossberg is a quarter in the district 4 of Winterthur, Zürich, Switzerland.

It was formerly a part of Töss municipality, which was incorporated into Winterthur in 1922.

Winterthur